Jim Brady is a former professional rugby league footballer who played in the 1970s.

Genealogical information
Jim Brady is the younger brother of the rugby league  who played in the 1960s and 1970s for Warrington; Brian 'Bully' Brady.

References

External links
Search for "Brady" at rugbyleagueproject.org

Living people
English rugby league players
Place of birth missing (living people)
Rugby league halfbacks
Swinton Lions players
Warrington Wolves players
Year of birth missing (living people)